Lisle Astor Wilson (September 2, 1943 – March 14, 2010), born Lisle Astor Wilson Jr., was an American actor known for playing Leonard Taylor on the ABC sitcom That's My Mama which ran from 1974 to 1975. His film roles included appearances in Brian De Palma's horror film Sisters (1972) and The Incredible Melting Man (1977). He was also widely recognized for his guest appearances on television shows such as Lou Grant, The White Shadow, and Falcon Crest, to name a few. Lisle was the Director of the American Academy of Dramatic Arts West in Pasadena, California for several years. After ending his regular acting career in 1992, Lisle went on to teach Vocal Techniques, to up and coming Broadcasters at the Academy of Radio and Television Broadcasting in Huntington Beach, California.  His parents were Lisle Wilson, Sr. and Cecile (Ross) Wilson.  Lisle Wilson died on March 14, 2010, reportedly of a brain tumor.

Filmography

External links

Lisle Wilson's obituary

1943 births
2010 deaths
20th-century American male actors
Male actors from California
African-American male actors
American male film actors
American male television actors
Male actors from New York City
Deaths from brain cancer in the United States
Deaths from cancer in California
People from Brooklyn
20th-century African-American people
21st-century African-American people